There are two Steely Dan compilation albums, identically named The Very Best of Steely Dan: Reelin' in the Years and with identical record covers, but with different songs. The first was released in 1985 and the latter in 1987.

Track listing
All songs are written and composed by Walter Becker and Donald Fagen.

1985 version

1987 version

References

1985 greatest hits albums
Steely Dan compilation albums